Alfedo Varela may refer to:

Alfredo Varela (Argentine writer) (1914–1984), Argentine communist writer
Alfredo Varela Jr. (1912–1984), Mexican screenwriter

See also
 Alfredo Varelli (born 1914), Italian film actor